The Baltimore & Ohio Railroad Bridge, Antietam Creek was a timber trestle bridge near Keedysville, Washington County, Maryland, United States. It carried the Washington County branch of the Baltimore and Ohio Railroad, later part of CSX Transportation, over the ravine formed by the Antietam Creek northwest of Keedysville. CSX abandoned the railroad line in the late 1970s or 1980s.

The Baltimore & Ohio Railroad Bridge, Antietam Creek was listed on the National Register of Historic Places in 1977. The bridge was subsequently removed completely.

See also
List of bridges documented by the Historic American Engineering Record in Maryland
List of bridges on the National Register of Historic Places in Maryland

References

External links
, including undated photo, at Maryland Historical Trust

Baltimore and Ohio Railroad bridges
Railroad bridges on the National Register of Historic Places in Maryland
Transportation buildings and structures in Washington County, Maryland
Railroad bridges in Maryland
Historic American Engineering Record in Maryland
National Register of Historic Places in Washington County, Maryland
Wooden bridges in Maryland
Trestle bridges in the United States
1867 establishments in Maryland
Bridges completed in 1867